The 17th European Film Awards were presented on December 11, 2004 in Barcelona, Spain. The winners were selected by the members of the European Film Academy.

Awards

Best Film

References

External links 
 European Film Academy Archive

2004 film awards
European Film Awards ceremonies
2004 in Catalonia
2004 in Europe
2004 in Spanish cinema